Habroloma nanum is a species of beetles belonging to the family Buprestidae.

It is native to Europe.

Synonyms:
 Habroloma nana (alternative combination)
 Habroloma geranii (Silfverberg, 1977)

References

Buprestidae